Ajapsandali is a traditional Georgian and Armenian dish, also popular in the Northern Caucasus. It consists of onion, eggplant, tomato and bell pepper grilled, stewed, or fried in vegetable oil and seasoned with garlic, basil, coriander leaves,  parsley and other seasoning. Sometimes potato, chili pepper and even carrots are added although traditional recipes do not include them.

See also
 Khoresh bademjan

References

External links
 Ajapsandali Georgian recipe

Cuisine of Georgia (country)
Armenian cuisine
Eggplant dishes
Vegetarian cuisine
Vegan cuisine